The 2008 IIHF World U18 Championship Division II was an international under-18 ice hockey competition organised by the International Ice Hockey Federation. Both Division II tournaments made up the third level of competition of the 2008 IIHF World U18 Championships. The Group A tournament took place between 30 March and 5 April 2008 in Meribel and Courchevel, France and the Group B tournament was played from 23 to 29 March 2008 in Tallinn, Estonia. France and Hungary won the Group A and B tournaments respectively and gained promotion to the Division I of the 2009 IIHF World U18 Championships.

Group A
Group A tournament was played in Meribel and Courchevel, France from 30 March to 5 April 2008.

Final Standings

Results

All times local

Group B
Group B tournament was played in Tallinn, Estonia at Arena Premia from 23 to 29 March 2008.

Final Standings

Results

All times local

See also
2008 IIHF World U18 Championships
2008 IIHF World U18 Championship Division I
2008 IIHF World U18 Championship Division III

External links
Group B - Official Tournament Reports

2008
2008
IIHF World U18 Championship Division II
II
World
2008 in French sport